Pterolophia subgrisescens is a species of beetle in the family Cerambycidae. It was described by Stephan von Breuning in 1975.

References

subgrisescens
Beetles described in 1975